1-Phenylpiperazine is a simple chemical compound featuring a phenyl group bound to a piperazine ring. The suffix ‘-piprazole’ is sometimes used in the names of drugs to indicate they belong to this class.

List phenylpiperazine derivatives
Alpertine [27076-46-6]
BP 554 [82900-57-0]
Butropipazone [2354-61-2]
CAM89 alluded to here: 
Centphenaquin [98459-16-6]
Centpropazine [91315-34-3] [34675-77-9]
Clodoxopone [71923-34-7]
Dropropizine [17692-31-8]
FAUC-299 [313972-96-2]
FAUC-312 [562104-72-7]
LASSBio-579 [591774-47-9]
LASSBio-581 [591774-48-0]
LASSBio-632
LASSBio-680
LASSBio-724
LASSBio-729 [66307-58-2]
LASSBio-730
McN 261 [1044-59-3]
Oxypertine
PD-158771 [189152-50-9]
PO-219
WIN 18,437 [4121-77-1]

See also
 Substituted piperazine
 Serotonin antagonist and reuptake inhibitor
 Benzylpiperazine
 Diphenylpiperazine
 Diphenylmethylpiperazine
 Pyridinylpiperazine
 Pyrimidinylpiperazine

References

External links

 
Piperazines
Anilines
Phenyl compounds